The 2018–19 SV Werder Bremen season is the 120th season in the football club's history and 38th consecutive and 55th overall season in the top flight of German football, the Bundesliga, having been promoted from the 2. Bundesliga Nord in 1981. In addition to the domestic league, Werder Bremen also are participating in this season's edition of the domestic cup, the DFB-Pokal. This is the 72nd season for Bremen in the Weser-Stadion, located in Bremen, Free Hanseatic City of Bremen, Germany. The season covers a period from 1 July 2018 to 30 June 2019.

Players

Squad information

Transfers In

Transfers Out

Friendly matches

Competitions

Overview

Bundesliga

League table

Results summary

Results by round

Matches

DFB-Pokal

Statistics

Appearances and goals

|-
! colspan=14 style=background:#dcdcdc; text-align:center| Goalkeepers

|-
! colspan=14 style=background:#dcdcdc; text-align:center| Defenders

|-
! colspan=14 style=background:#dcdcdc; text-align:center| Midfielders

|-
! colspan=14 style=background:#dcdcdc; text-align:center| Forwards

|-
! colspan=14 style=background:#dcdcdc; text-align:center| Players transferred out during the season

|-

References

SV Werder Bremen seasons
Bremen